Ali Khan in Iran may refer to:
 Ali Khan, Sistan and Baluchestan
 Ali Khan-e Kachkul, Sistan and Baluchestan Province
 Ali Khan-e Zaman, Sistan and Baluchestan Province
 Ali Khan, alternate name of Deh Now-e Ali Khan, Sistan and Baluchestan Province